The Capability Acquisition and Sustainment Group (CASG) is an organisation within the Australian Department of Defence, responsible for acquisition, supply chain management, and sustainment of military equipment and materiel including aircraft, ships, vehicles, electronic systems, weapons, ordnance, uniforms and rations for the Australian Defence Force. CASG employs more than 7000 military, civilian and contracted staff in more than 70 locations around Australia and internationally. 

CASG was established in June 2015 after the Defence Materiel Organisation was disbanded after recommendations from the First Principles Review.

As of 30 June 2021, Defence through the Capability Acquisition and Sustainment Group (CASG) was managing 161 major projects and 13 minor acquisition projects, at various phases in the Capability Life Cycle, worth a total of $121.6 billion, with an annual acquisition budget was A$9.3 billion. CASG was also managing 109 sustainment products with a total annual budget of A$7.7 billion; for a total annual budget of A$17.0 billion.

History

The Defence Materiel Organisation was formed in 2000 when the then Defence Acquisition Organisation merged with Support Command Australia, bringing together the Department of Defence's capital acquisition and logistics organisations into a single entity. The DMO was given responsibility for purchasing, through-life support and disposal of military equipment assets, other than facilities and administrative assets.

In July 2005, DMO became a Prescribed Agency under Australian Financial Management and Accountability legislation, meaning that although it remains a part of the Department of Defence, it was separately accountable to the Minister of Defence for its budget and performance.

DMO's stated vision was to become the leading program management and engineering services organisation in Australia. Its goal was to deliver projects and sustainment on time, on budget and to the required capability, safety and quality.

The DMO budget in 2012–13 was A$9 billion, shared between purchasing new equipment and sustainment and through-life support (maintenance, upgrades, fuels, explosive ordnance and spares).

Mortimer review
In May 2008, the Australian Government commissioned a review of Defence procurement, which included in its terms of reference a report on the progress of implementing reforms from the last such review – the 2003 Kinnaird Review.

The review was conducted by David Mortimer, who presented his findings in September 2008. Mortimer identified five principal areas of concern. There was/were:
 inadequate project management resources in the Capability Development Group,
 inefficiencies in the processes leading to government approvals for new projects,
 personnel and skill shortages in the DMO,
 delays due to industry capacity and capability, and
 difficulties in the introduction of equipment into full service.

In all, Mortimer made 46 recommendations, with 42 accepted in full by the Government and three accepted in part. One recommendation was not accepted – that the DMO should be separated from the Department of Defence and become an executive agency. This recommendation, which was also made in the 2003 Kinnaird Review, was not implemented by the Howard government. As an executive agency, the DMO would receive its own acquisition funding stream as a government appropriation, and would be headed by a chief executive with "significant private sector and commercial experience". Mortimer also recommended that a general manager Commercial position be created to implement a business-like focus throughout the organisation.

Post-Mortimer reforms

Ministerial statements in 2010 and 2011 suggested that the Government believed new procurement reforms were needed.  On 26 November 2010, the Minister for Defence, Stephen Smith, in adding project AIR 5418 Joint Air to Surface Stand-off Missile (JASSM) to the 'Projects of Concern' list, stated that the listing was because of "our poor management, our failure to keep government properly and fully informed about the project and its difficulties." Minister Smith also said that he had asked Defence to review the effectiveness of its management of major projects. On 6 May 2011 Minister Smith announced further Defence procurement reforms aimed at improving project management, minimising risk at project start and identifying problems early and on 29 June 2011, Minister Smith announced reforms to the management of 'Projects of Concern' including the development of formal remediation plans for designated projects.

First Principles Review
On 1 April 2015, the Minister for Defence released the First Principles Review. The review recommended that the Defence Materiel Organisation should be disbanded and the transfer of its core responsibilities in relation to capability delivery to a new Capability Acquisition and Sustainment Group, which took effect from 1 July 2015.

The First Principles developed were: 

 Clear authorities and accountabilities that align with resources
 Decision-makers are empowered and held responsible for delivering on strategies and plans within agreed resourcing.
 Outcome orientation
 Delivering what is required with processes, systems and tools being the ‘means not the end’.
 Simplicity
 Eliminating complicated and unnecessary structures, processes, systems and tools.
 Focus on core business
 Defence doing only for itself what no one else can do more effectively and efficiently.
 Professionalism
 Committed people with the right skills in appropriate jobs
 Timely, contestable advice
 Using internal and external expertise to provide the best advice so that the outcome is delivered in the most cost-effective and efficient manner.
 Transparency
 Honest and open behaviour which enables others to know exactly what Defence is doing and why.

The Focus on core business principle led to the contracting of many roles within CASG, and the lowest number of civilian APS staff within Defence.

Structure
Maritime Domain
 Maritime Systems Division
Major Surface Ships Branch
Specialist Ship Branch
Maritime Support Branch
 Submarines Division
 Ships Acquisition Division
Land Domain

 Land Systems Division
Integrated Soldier Systems Branch
Land Manoeuvre Systems Branch
Land Vehicle Systems Branch
Explosive Materiel Branch 
Land Engineering Agency
Armoured Vehicle Division

Air Domain
 Aerospace Systems Division
Airlift and Tanker Systems Branch
Aerospace Combat Systems Branch
Aerospace Surveillance and Response Branch
Joint Strike Fighter
 Rotary, Aerospace and Surveillance Systems Division
 Air Domain Centre
 Air and Space Surveillance Control Branch
 Army Aviation Systems Branch
 Navy Aviation, Aircrew Training and Commons
 Navy Army Aviation Acquisition Program Office
Joint Systems Domain

 Joint Systems Division
Intelligence, Surveillance, Reconnaissance and Electronic Warfare (ISREW) Branch
Joint Command, Control, Communications and Computer Systems (JC4S) Branch
Land Command, Control, Communications and Computer Systems (LC4S) Branch
Space Systems (SPACE) Branch

Business Management Domain
 Commercial Division
 Commercial and Financial Analysis Directorate (CFA)
 Commercial Policy and Practice Directorate (CPP)
 Materiel Procurement Branch (MPB)
 Non Materiel Procurement Branch (NMPB)
 Program Performance Division
 Corporate Performance Branch
 Business Analysis and Reform Branch
 Program Management Branch
 Materiel Logistics Branch
 Chief Systems Engineering Branch

Leadership
Dr Stephen Gumley was the DMO's chief executive officer from February 2004 until his retirement was announced by the Minister for Defence, Stephen Smith, on 7 July 2011. Gumley had headed an executive team of around 20 senior managers. According to the DMO website, the executive team has considerable private and public sector experience, as well as extensive military domain knowledge.

In March 2009, the Corporate general manager of the DMO, Jane Wolfe, was dismissed for unsatisfactory performance. The Canberra Times reported that its 'senior public service sources' believe she is the highest-ranking Australian Commonwealth public servant to ever have been dismissed for underperformance. Wolfe was reinstated in April 2010 following a legal challenge against procedural aspects of her dismissal in the Federal Court of Australia. The case is said to have "significant implications" for the Senior Executive Service of the Australian Public Service, where legal challenges to performance decisions have been rare.

On 13 February 2012, Warren King (former Deputy CEO) was appointed CEO.

On 31 August 2015, Kim Gillis was appointed Deputy Secretary CASG. 

In November 2018, Tony Fraser was appointed Deputy Secretary CASG.

In August 2022, Chris Deeble was appointed Deputy Secretary CASG.

See also
Defence industry of Australia

References

External links 
 
 Mortimer Review into Defence Procurement and Sustainment

Further reading 
 Ergas, Henry. 'Some Economic Aspects of the Weapons Systems Acquisition Process' (2003); available from CRA International

Australian Defence Force
Leadership of the Australian Defence Force
Military logistics of Australia
2000 establishments in Australia